John Fraser (1721 – 16 April 1773) was a fur trader licensed by the Province of Pennsylvania for its western frontier, an interpreter with Native Americans, a gunsmith, a guide and lieutenant in the British army, and a land speculator. He served in several of England's expeditions against the French and their allies in the vicinity of Fort Duquesne and later Fort Pitt.

Born in the Scottish Highlands, Fraser, age 14, arrived in Pennsylvania and settled for a short time near the Susquehanna River in Dauphin County. He next moved west over the Allegheny Mountains to establish an English trading post at the Native American village of Venango (now Franklin, Pennsylvania), at the junction of French Creek and the Allegheny River. For some ten years there he bartered his gunsmith services, English manufactured goods, and alcohol, in exchange for Indian pelts and furs. In 1749 French expeditionary activity led by Pierre Joseph Céloron de Blainville forced Fraser to abandon Venango and move south to the Forks of the Ohio.

At the mouth of Turtle Creek (Monongahela River) he built a new cabin, from which to trade with the Indians once again. There he aided George Washington  and his guide Christopher Gist during Washington's early diplomacy with the French. (According to Washington's 1753 journal, by this time Fraser's cabin at Venango flew the French colors; by the next year both the Venango cabin and its forge had been incorporated by the French into the new Fort Machault.)

During the French and Indian War Fraser served in colonial and British uniform, against the French, under Captain William Trent, George Washington, General Edward Braddock, and General John Forbes.

Fraser's Turtle Creek cabin stood through the Battle of the Monongahela and for decades more, until about 1804. The site today is located in North Braddock, Pennsylvania on the land where, since 1872, sits the Edgar Thomson Steel Works established by Andrew Carnegie. Fraser, who petitioned the government for restitution for his losses during his war service, also speculated in land purchases on the frontier. He was granted 300 acres near Fort Ligonier along the Forbes Road in 1766. On April 1, 1769 he successfully purchased all of Braddock's Field as well as the cabin he had built there.

Fraser married Jane Fraser (formerly Jane Bell and Jane McClain) in 1754. On October 1, 1755, while returning to her home from the Fort Cumberland trading post several miles away, Jane was captured by Indians and taken to the Miami River near Dayton, Ohio. She eventually escaped and returned 18 months later only to learn that Fraser, her husband, had remarried because he assumed that she was dead. Fraser took her back, and he returned his second wife home to her father. Ruby Frazier Frey, a descendant, in 1946 published an historical novel, Red Morning, telling of Jane’s experiences.

In 1771 John Fraser was appointed by Governor Penn as a justice of the peace for the newly formed Bedford County, Pennsylvania, where two years later he died suddenly. The Orphan's Court ruled that his widow Jane Fraser should sell some of the Fraser land to satisfy debts and to support her eight minor children. On October 14, 1774, Braddock's battlefield sold to Daniel Razior. In 1790 his 300 acres near Fort Ligonier sold to Father Theodore Brouwers, O.F.M., who founded there the first Catholic Church parish west of the Alleghenies, and by 1846 Saint Vincent College and Saint Vincent Archabbey was established (now the oldest Benedictine monastery in the United States).

In 18th century documents his surname is spelled three ways: Frazer, Frazier, and Fraser. Fraser is the common Scottish spelling of the name and is used by many of John Fraser's descendants.

References

Clark, Howard Glenn. "John Fraser, Western Pennsylvania Frontiersman," Western Pennsylvania History Magazine, Vol. 38 (Numbers 3,4) 1955; Vol. 39 (Numbers 1,2), 1956.

1721 births
1773 deaths
Colonial American Indian agents
Colonial American merchants
People of Pennsylvania in the French and Indian War
People of colonial Pennsylvania
History of Pittsburgh